Scheaffer Okore is the vice-chairperson of Ukweli Party and former head of programs for civic engagement at Siasa place. She holds a bachelor's degree in International Relations and Diplomacy from the University of Nairobi.

Scheaffer is an activist in Kenya who has been vocal about social justice, human rights, feminism, and gender-based violence.

In 2018. Okore was considered by Africa Youth Awards as one of top one hundred  most prominent youth in the field of law.

References

Kenyan women in politics
Kenyan feminists
Kenyan women's rights activists
Year of birth missing (living people)
Living people